Henry Patrick Hughes (August 13, 1904 – December 12, 1968) was an American jurist from Oshkosh, Wisconsin.

Hughs was born in Randolph, Wisconsin, the son of William Hughes (1870–1917) and Clara Hepp Hughes (1872–1950). Hughes went to Marquette University and then received his law degree at the now Georgetown University Law Center. In 1930 he married Dorothy Callahan (1906–1980), with whom he had four sons. In 1937, he was appointed a Wisconsin Circuit Court judge. In 1948, Hughes was elected to the Wisconsin Supreme Court resigning in 1951. He then resumed his law practice.

Hughes died from a skull fracture when his vehicle hit a stopped school bus on a highway in Nekimi, Wisconsin.

References

External links

People from Fountain Prairie, Wisconsin
Marquette University alumni
Georgetown University Law Center alumni
Wisconsin state court judges
Justices of the Wisconsin Supreme Court
1904 births
1968 deaths
20th-century American lawyers
20th-century American judges